Lake Cook Road (also known as Lake Cook) is a Metra station along the Milwaukee District North Line, situated on the border between Northbrook and Deerfield, Illinois. In Metra's zone-based fare system, Lake Cook Road is in zone E. As of 2018, Lake Cook Road is the 43rd busiest of Metra's 236 non-downtown stations, with an average of 1,086 weekday boardings. The station exists along a railroad line that originally served the Chicago, Milwaukee, St. Paul and Pacific Railroad. It is the last stop outbound on the line inside Cook County. The station opened in January 1996 as an infill station.

As of December 12, 2022, Lake Cook Road is served by 45 trains (20 inbound, all 25 outbound) on weekdays, by all 20 trains (10 in each direction) on Saturdays, and by all 18 trains (nine in each direction) on Sundays and holidays.

Unlike the historic  station, Lake Cook Road is somewhat more modern-looking. Despite classic features, it contains far more contemporary paint trim and a "Metra" sign over the front doorway, rather than anything from the old Milwaukee Road. Parking is available along the west side of the tracks through a frontage road along Lake Cook Road leading to the intersection of Deerlake Road. This is due to the railroad bridge over Lake Cook Road. The parking lot also contains a section strictly for Pace buses. The station is across the tracks from some shopping centers at the corner of Lake Cook Road and Waukegan Road and is in close proximity to Interstate 94 west of the IL 43 partial interchange.

Bus connections
Pace 
626 Skokie - Buffalo Grove Limited
627 Shuttle Bug 7 (service to Discover Financial Horizon Therapeutics offices)
631 Shuttle Bug 1 (service to Discover and Wolters Kluwer offices)
632 Shuttle Bug 2 (service to Baxter International headquarters and offices in Parkway North)
633 Shuttle Bug 3 (service to Walgreens and Walgreens Boots Alliance offices)
634 Shuttle Bug 4 (service to Walgreens and Oracle offices)
635 Shuttle Bug 5 (service to Walgreens and Underwriter Laboratories offices)

Routes 627, 631, 632, 633, 634 and 635 are currently suspended due to the COVID-19 pandemic.

References

External links

Lake Cook Road
Railway stations in Lake County, Illinois
Railway stations in Cook County, Illinois
Deerfield, Illinois
Railway stations in the United States opened in 1996